The Łódź tram system is a tramway network located in Łódź, Poland that has been in operation since 1898.

The system is operated by MPK Łódź Sp. z.o.o.

History

By the 1890s, Łódź had over 300,000 inhabitants. Łódź was a large industrial city characterized by textile industry, and a lack of wide streets, ring roads and a reliable public transport system. All passenger and freight traffic was concentrated in the city center, especially on Piotrkowska Street. Up to one thousand cabs and carriages drove around the city centre. Both the city government and local industrialists wanted to provide a solution to this situation, and therefore took up the construction of a tram past the city centre. In 1883, the first attempt to build a horse tram was made, which in the end was abandoned. The project was tendered, but ultimately, never completed.

A project with electric trams was then started, which would carry passengers by day and cargo by night. The Electric Railway Consortium Lodz (KEL) won a tender for construction the line. Julius Kunitzer signed the contract in St. Petersburg in front of Nicholas II on behalf of the KEL. He was backed by the German company AEG, which then started construction in the summer of 1897. 

Trams in Łódź made their first appearance on 23 December 1898. Łódź was the first city to have electric trams in what was then Congress Poland. Initially, there were two fairly short tram lines that both served the city centre area; by February 1899 their number was doubled. In 1901, the first suburban tram lines started – the Pabianice and Zgierz lines. Both of these initiatives were the result of the activities of private companies in which German manufacturers dominated.

The experiment with electric trams in Łódź fared even better than expected. Trams quickly paid off the cost of line construction, and the project brought considerable profits to its shareholders, whereas traffic in the center of the city decreased. Between 1910 and 1931, suburban tram lines connected many important places around the city. In the first half of the 1990s, some of those lines were closed down.

Currently MPK operates 18 urban and 5 regional (or suburban) lines.

While Łódź is acknowledged to be the first city in Poland to have a fully electrified tram system, it is less well known that unusually Łódź once boasted a small cemetery where tram drivers were buried. Sadly, nothing remains of this graveyard, which was situated on Lindley Street near the aptly named Tram Street (ul. Tramwajowa). Today, the cemetery plot where old tram drivers would have been laid to rest is occupied by the Lodz University Press and a language school.

In 2008, a teenager, described by his teachers as an "electronic genius", was arrested after using a remote control device he had assembled to cause several derailments and other accidents in the Łódź tramway system.

Lines 

There are 24 lines on the network; 4 lines are currently not in operation (as of 2022), on which replacement buses operate.

Lines are divided into colours to refer to the location on the main communication artery.

Types of vehicles 
The following table shows the vehicles used for tram communication in Łódź (as of the 7th of April 2022).

References

Bibliography

External links
 MPK Łódź homepage, in English

Transport in Łódź
Tram transport in Poland
Railway companies established in 1898
Metre gauge railways in Poland
Lodz